Luís Inácio Lucena Adams (born 2 March 1965) is a Brazilian lawyer who was appointed to be Brazil's Attorney General on 23 October 2009.

Adams earned his LL.B from the Faculty of Law of the Federal University of Rio Grande do Sul in Porto Alegre, the capital of the State of Rio Grande do Sul, and later pursued an LL.M. from the Faculty of Law of the Federal University of Santa Catarina, in Florianópolis, the capital of the State of Santa Catarina.

He was attorney for the National Treasury from 1993. In 2006, assumed leadership of the Attorney General of the Treasury. Both posts are held in Brasília, the capital of Brazil.

References

1965 births
Living people
Brazilian people of American descent
Election people
People from Porto Alegre
Attorneys General of Brazil